Allen Bailey (born March 25, 1989) is an American football defensive end who is a free agent. He played college football for the University of Miami.

Early years
Bailey was born in Sapelo Island, Georgia. He attended McIntosh County Academy in McIntosh County, Georgia and played linebacker and fullback. As a senior, he played in only four games due to a stress fracture in his back and had one sack. As a junior, he had 138 tackles and three sacks. He also had 323 yards on 51 carries with four touchdowns as a fullback.

College career
As a University of Miami freshman in 2007, Bailey played in all 12 games, mainly on special teams, but appeared in two games as a linebacker. He finished with four tackles. As a sophomore in 2008 Bailey played in 12 games, starting four at defensive end. He finished the season with 36 tackles and five sacks.

As a junior in 2009, Bailey has 24 tackles and seven sacks.

Professional career

At the 2011 NFL Combine, Bailey had the third-highest vertical leap of any defensive lineman, at 36.5".  He was drafted in the third round, with the 86th overall pick, of the 2011 NFL Draft by the Kansas City Chiefs. Bailey recorded his first sack against the Packers in week 15. Bailey ended his 2011 season with one sack and 10 tackles. He had only five tackles in 10 games in 2012. The 2013 season was a turning point for Bailey after playing in 15 games finishing the year with 30 tackles, a sack, and two batted passes. In 2014, Bailey produced career highs in almost every defensive stat finishing with 41 combined tackles, five sacks, and two passes defended.

Kansas City Chiefs
On November 15, 2014, the Chiefs signed Bailey to a four-year, $25 million contract extension with $15 million in guaranteed, and a signing bonus of $10 million. He finished 2015 with 38 tackles, 4.5 sacks, and two forced fumbles.

On October 18, 2016, Bailey was placed on injured reserve.

In 2018, Bailey played in all 16 games with 13 starts, recording 38 combined tackles, a career-high six sacks, two forced fumbles, and a league-leading four fumble recoveries.

Atlanta Falcons
On July 22, 2019, Bailey signed a two-year $10.5 million deal with the Atlanta Falcons. He played in 15 games with five starts, recording 26 tackles and one sack.

On March 25, 2020, Bailey signed a one-year, $4.5 million contract extension through 2021.

The Falcons released Bailey on February 18, 2021.

References

External links
 

1989 births
Living people
American football defensive tackles
American football defensive ends
American people of Guinean descent
Sportspeople of Guinean descent
Atlanta Falcons players
Kansas City Chiefs players
Miami Hurricanes football players
People from McIntosh County, Georgia
Players of American football from Georgia (U.S. state)